The Yamaha YZR-M1 is an inline-four motorcycle specifically developed by Yamaha Motor Company to race in the current MotoGP series. It succeeded the  YZR500 by the 2002 season and was originally developed with a  engine. Since then, the YZR-M1 has been continuously developed into several iterations through the 990cc, 800cc and 1000cc eras of Grand Prix Motorcycle Racing.

2002–2003 

2002 was the first season which allowed 990 cc 4-strokes to be raced alongside 500 cc 2-strokes. In a change from their V-4 YZR500, Yamaha designed the YZR-M1 (for "Mission One") with an inline-4 engine because it was the format considered to have the best mutual balance with the frame. Also, Yamaha wanted to preserve the superior handling of the YZR500, so the M1's engine was designed to fit in a chassis developed around the basic structure of the YZR500. The M1 was outfitted with an electronic engine management system that controlled the engine braking endemic to 4-strokes. The new engine had 5 valves per cylinder, was fed by carburetors and began with a displacement of 942 cc; in the second half of the season it progressed up to the full 990 cc regulation limit. The frame design also evolved during the season, with adjustment of the engine mounting position and change in the fuel tank shape.

The M1 was test-ridden and developed by Max Biaggi, John Kocinski, Norihiko Fujiwara and Kyoji Namba throughout 2001. It was raced in the 2002 season by Biaggi and Carlos Checa on the factory team, and towards the end of the season M1s were also provided to Norifumi Abe, Olivier Jacque and Shinya Nakano. Biaggi achieved two wins and placed second in the final standings as did Yamaha in the manufacturers' championship.

In 2003, the engine went from carburetion to fuel injection, and the engine brake control system was replaced with an Idle Control System that automatically adjusted the throttle valve opening on two of the four cylinders to improve stability and handling during deceleration. M1 riders were Checa, Alex Barros, Olivier Jacque, Marco Melandri, Shinya Nakano and Norifumi Abe, and there were no wins and Yamaha came in third in the manufacturers' championship.

2004/2005 

Valentino Rossi signed a two-year contract with Yamaha, reportedly worth in excess of US$6 million per season, in a move that was described by the press as "biting off more than he could chew". It was widely felt not only by his critics and media pundits but also by many fans, that even he would not be able to bring the struggling YZR-M1 up to the level of the hereto all-conquering Honda RC211V. A well-publicised increase in the pace of development of the Honda machine over the winter season fuelled expectation that a Honda RC211V in the hands of riders the calibre of Max Biaggi and Sete Gibernau would have no problem in retaining the World Title for Honda.

Meanwhile, Rossi wasn't the only defection Honda had to contend with; Jeremy Burgess (crew chief for Rossi at Honda), along with the majority of his long-established crew, were convinced by Rossi to join him at Yamaha. This was a shrewd move and was cited by Rossi in his autobiography as being instrumental in providing him with the strong basis necessary for launching an attack on the Championship with the YZR-M1.

During 2003/2004 winter testing, Yamaha stepped up to the plate by pulling out all the stops in their collaboration with Rossi and Burgess. Through a systematic regime of innovation and testing, they sought to refine the M1's traditionally strong traits such as good braking and quick handling (which impressed Rossi), and marry them with good balance and transition to power. Working closely with Rossi and Burgess, Yamaha engineers under YZR-M1 project leader Koichi Tsuji experimented with a number of engine modifications in an attempt to fix the power delivery, and finally, it was decided to go ahead with a four-valve per cylinder head configuration (as opposed to the earlier five-valve head), with a specially refined cylinder firing order. This turned the straight four-cylinder engine from a traditional "screamer", where the power pulses are spaced equally (every 180 crank degrees) in the four-stroke cycle, into a so-called "long bang" engine where the power pulses are grouped unevenly across the cycle (270-180-90-180). This firing order mimics the constant kinetic energy of a V4 engine while maintaining the desirable engine packaging of a traditional inline four-cylinder. These developments significantly improved the torque characteristics of the engine, and coupled with slight changes to the position of the engine in the chassis, made the M1 much easier to control at the limit of adhesion while exiting corners. After a frantic winter of development and testing, the team showed the world that they had made a significant step in the right direction, when Rossi and the M1 won the BMW car at the 2004 pre-season IRTA test at Catalunya, by posting the fastest lap of the open session (similar to normal race qualifying).

With the traditional first race of the season at Suzuka off the list due to safety considerations, the 2004 season started at Welkom in South Africa. In a quite remarkable race, Rossi came through to claim the victory, not only silencing his critics but becoming the first man in history to win two GPs back to back with two different manufacturers. Rossi would go on to claim 8 more GP wins on his way to win the 2004 Championship, with a tally of 304 points. Honda riders Sete Gibernau and Max Biaggi took second and third with 257 and 217 points respectively.

The 2004 season would, therefore, unfold to give Rossi the opportunity he had sought; to prove that it was his talent rather than just the bike that had won him his championships. In so doing, he also achieved one of the great coups in the history of Motorcycle Racing.

The YZR-M1 and Rossi partnership continued to dominate in 2005 when the Championship was won by a massive 147 point margin over Honda rider Marco Melandri in second place. The 2005 M1 was hailed by insiders to be a great race bike, it illustrated that Yamaha with input from Rossi had created a race bike to beat the others quite easily. Rossi would go on later to say that the 2005 M1 was the greatest bike he has ever ridden.

2006 

The 2006 season proved a little more problematic for Yamaha, with the M1 suffering from chatter from the very first race of the year. It would be a recurring problem for all Yamaha riders in the first third of the season, and was thought to be a function of three major winter season developments; namely a significant hike in engine power, a new stiffer chassis and a new construction of Michelin tire with an even stickier compound and revised profile. Because all three developments occurred almost simultaneously, the usual meticulous testing of one development at a time was compromised and it would take much of the early season to understand and overcome the problems.

This setback for Yamaha and the YZR-M1 was largely responsible for Valentino Rossi's mediocre season start in 2006, manifest by poor qualifying performances and a brace of bad luck, he also suffered a wrist injury midseason, which added to his woes. In the final third of a memorable season, the M1's problems were virtually eradicated, and Valentino Rossi turned in a string of performances that would close down a large points gap on Championship leader Nicky Hayden aboard the Honda RC211V. It was only in the final race of the season that the M1 and Valentino Rossi were beaten by just five points and Yamaha relinquished the Championship back to Honda in the hands of Nicky Hayden, who only won two races that season. Hayden would later state that Rossi deserved to be the champion, but luck and DNFs cost him the championship. Valentino Rossi would win 5 races in 2006 to Nicky Hayden's 2, a fact that was well played during the offseason.

2007
Regulations again changed for the 2007 seasonwith the capacity of MotoGP machines reduced to 800 cc in an effort by the FIM to reduce the ever-increasing speeds of the 990 cc bikes (capable of well in excess of 210 mph (340 km/h)); therefore the YZR-M1 would continue in 2007 in 800 cc form. In post-2006 and in 2007 pre-season testing, the new 800 cc equipped YZR-M1 (along with other 800 cc MotoGP bikes) has been paradoxically quicker straight out of the box than the 990 cc version of the M1. This is by virtue of later, harder braking, quicker handling, higher corner speeds, and more controllable traction, and as the 2007 season got underway, the 800 cc YZR-M1 was expected to get quicker as its development continued.

The chatter that plagued the early 2006 YZR-M1 has been eliminated in the switch to 800 cc. While the main sponsor for the Official Factory Yamaha Team switched from Camel with their distinctive yellow and blue livery, to that of the Italian Motor Manufacturer Fiat. The team ran initially in a blue and white colour scheme and hinted at the unusual intention of running a variety of colour schemes throughout the season.

Casey Stoner won the 2007 Championship with the factory Ducati.

2008
Rossi won the 2008 Championship, by a record margin and dominated podium finishes all season. Teammate Jorge Lorenzo managed a first-ever Rookie win on the M1 at the Portuguese GP, and had 6 podium finishes.

2013 
Jorge Lorenzo won 2012 Championship, closely followed by Dani Pedrosa.

Specifications

Successes 
These results are accurate up to the 2022 Dutch TT.

World Championship titles:
Constructors: 5
Riders: 8 
Valentino Rossi 4 times
Jorge Lorenzo 3 times
Fabio Quartararo 1 time
Teams: 7 
Gauloises Fortuna Yamaha
Gauloises Yamaha Team
Fiat Yamaha Team
Movistar Yamaha MotoGP
Monster Energy Yamaha

Races won: 125:
2002: Biaggi 2 (2 in total)
2004: Rossi 9 (9 in total)
2005: Rossi 11 (11 in total)
2006: Rossi 5 (5 in total)
2007: Rossi 4 (4 in total)
2008: Rossi 9, Lorenzo 1 (10 in total)
2009: Rossi 6, Lorenzo 4 (10 in total)
2010: Lorenzo 9, Rossi 2 (11 in total)
2011: Lorenzo 3, Spies 1 (4 in total)
2012: Lorenzo 6 (6 in total)
2013: Lorenzo 8, Rossi 1 (9 in total)
2014: Rossi 2, Lorenzo 2 (4 in total)
2015: Lorenzo 7, Rossi 4 (11 in total)
2016: Lorenzo 4, Rossi 2 (6 in total)
2017: Viñales 3, Rossi 1 (4 in total)
2018: Viñales 1 (1 in total)
2019: Viñales 2 (2 in total)
2020: Quartararo 3, Morbidelli 3, Viñales 1 (7 in total)
2021: Quartararo 5, Viñales 1 (6 in total)
2022: Quartararo 3 (season still in progress)

Poles: 121:
2002: Biaggi 4, Checa 1 (5 in total)
2004: Rossi 5, Checa 1 (6 in total)
2005: Rossi 5 (5 in total)
2006: Rossi 5 (5 in total)
2007: Rossi 4, Edwards 2 (6 in total)
2008: Lorenzo 4, Rossi 2, Edwards 1 (7 in total)
2009: Rossi 7, Lorenzo 5 (12 in total)
2010: Lorenzo 7, Rossi 1, Spies 1 (9 in total)
2011: Lorenzo 2 (2 in total)
2012: Lorenzo 7 (7 in total)
2013: Lorenzo 4, Crutchlow 2 (6 in total)
2014: Rossi 1, Lorenzo 1 (2 in total)
2015: Lorenzo 5, Rossi 1 (6 in total)
2016: Lorenzo 4, Rossi 3 (7 in total)
2017: Viñales 5, Zarco 2 (7 in total)
2018: Zarco 2, Rossi 1, Viñales 1 (4 in total)
2019: Quartararo 6, Viñales 3 (9 in total)
2020: Quartararo 4, Viñales 3, Morbidelli 2 (9 in total)
2021: Quartararo 5, Viñales 1 (6 in total)
2022: Quartararo 1 (Season still in progress)

Complete MotoGP results 
(key) (results in bold indicate pole position; results in italics indicate fastest lap)

* Season still in progress.

See also 
 Aprilia RS-GP
 Honda RC213V
 Suzuki GSX-RR
 KTM RC16
 Ducati Desmosedici

Notes

References

External links 

 The current YZR-M1 
 Yamaha Explains Use of Carburettors on M1
 Yamaha Spills the Beans on YZR-M1 GP Racer

Yamaha motorcycles
Grand Prix motorcycles
Motorcycles introduced in 2002